Alan Fabbri (born 4 January 1979 in Bondeno) is an Italian politician.

Fabbri is a member of the right-wing party Lega Nord and served as mayor of Bondeno from 2009 to 2015.

He was elected Mayor of Ferrara at the 2019 local elections and took office on 11 June 2019.

He is the first centre-right mayor of the city since the end of World War II.

References

External links 
 

1979 births
Living people
Mayors of places in Emilia-Romagna
Politicians from Ferrara
Lega Nord politicians